Africasia is a genus of mites belonging to the family Athienemanniidae.

The species of this genus are found in Africa.

Species:

Africasia acuticoxalis
Africasia comorosensis 
Africasia mahadensis 
Africasia navina 
Africasia pinguipalpis 
Africasia rotunda 
Africasia rucira 
Africasia ruksa 
Africasia subterranea 
Africasia vietnamitica

References

Trombidiformes
Trombidiformes genera